The Colt M1892 Navy and Army was the first general issue double-action revolver with a swing out cylinder used by the U.S. military.

Overview

In 1892, the revolver was adopted by the United States Army chambered for .38 Long Colt cartridges, and was given the appellation "New Army and Navy". Initial experience with the gun caused officials to request some improvements. This would be an ongoing condition, resulting in Models 1892, 1894, 1896, 1901, and 1903 for the Army, as well as a Model 1895 for the Navy and a Model 1905 Marine Corps variant.

Features

The revolver featured a counter-clockwise rotating cylinder, which could be opened for loading and ejection by simply pulling back on a catch mounted on the left side of the frame behind the recoil shield. It was easily manipulated by the thumb of the right hand, and upon release the cylinder could be poked out sideways with the shooter's forefinger. Empty cases were removed by simply pushing back on an ejector rod to activate a star extractor. The six-shooter could then be quickly reloaded and the cylinder clicked back into place.

Sights
Sights were the basic rounded front blade and topstrap notch. The finish on all military revolvers was blue, though civilian guns could be nickeled or with other special finishes and embellishments.

History and usage
The M1892's counter-clockwise cylinder rotation tended to force the cylinder out of alignment with the frame over time, and this was exacerbated by relatively weak lockwork used to "time", or match individual chambers to the barrel.  In 1908, Colt improved and strengthened the lockwork, and changed the cylinder rotation to a clockwise movement.

A Model 1892 revolver was recovered from the USS Maine after it exploded in Havana Harbor in 1898. It was presented to then-Assistant Secretary of the Navy Theodore Roosevelt, who would later become President of the United States. Roosevelt brandished this pistol to rally his Rough Riders during the famed charge up San Juan Hill on July 1, 1898. This revolver was on display at Sagamore Hill and was stolen from there in 1963, recovered and then stolen again in 1990. It was recovered in 2006 and returned to Sagamore Hill on June 14, 2006.

This revolver was thought of as a decent handgun for its time, but complaints arose from the military concerning the revolver's cartridge chambering. Beginning in 1899, combat reports arose from the Philippines campaign regarding the poor performance of the M1892's .38-caliber ammunition.  Specifically, users complained that the .38 bullet repeatedly failed to stop charging Filipino rebels  at close ranges, even when hit multiple times. The complaints caused the U.S. Army to hurriedly issue stocks of .45 caliber revolvers, and played a central role in its decision to replace the M1892 with the .45 Colt M1909 New Service revolver in 1909.

In the rush to furnish arms to the rapidly expanding Army and Navy after the United States entered World War I, surplus stocks of these old Colts were inspected, refurbished as needed, and then issued to rear-echelon Army troops and Navy officers as a substitute standard side arm.

Modifications and variants
During its service life, the M1892 series received modifications to the basic design, including cylinder lockwork, the addition (in 1894) of an interlock between the cylinder latch and the trigger and hammer, different barrel markings, the addition of a lanyard ring in the Model 1901, and a reduction of bore diameter in the Model 1903 in an effort to increase accuracy.

References

Bibliography
 Official U.S. Army description of the original Army Model 1892 revolver and its .38 Long Colt ammunition.
 Revised U.S. Army description of the M1892 series of revolvers and their ammunition. (Note the ballistics and trajectory data values in this description, except for muzzle velocity, are unchanged from the 1893 description, which has a lower muzzle velocity from an older cartridge; therefore this data must be considered as only approximate for the newer revolvers and cartridges.)

External links
The Colt Revolver in the American West—Model 1903 New Army and Navy

Colt revolvers
Revolvers of the United States
Double-action revolvers
Military revolvers